Julie Atherton is a British actress and singer. On 3 October 2009, she finished portraying the roles of Kate Monster and Lucy the Slut in the West End production of Avenue Q. She released her debut album, A Girl of Few Words, on 2 October 2006. After signing with the Speckulation record label, she released her second album titled No Space for Air in the Summer of 2010. She starred as Sister Mary Robert in the first UK tour of Sister Act: The Musical in 2011. In 2013 she was featured as 'French Teacher' in the world premiere of the musical 'LIFT' by Craig Adams and Ian Watson, at the Soho Theatre. This was followed in 2014 by the title role in 'Thérèse Raquin', again by Craig Adams with Book and Lyrics by Nona Shepphard. After a sold out run at The Finborough Theatre the production transferred to Park Theatre in Finsbury Park. Julie wrapped up a stellar year in 2014 with the release of her third album titled 'Rush of Life', with songs written for her by Craig Adams, Dougal Irvine, Lance Horne, George Maguire and Benedict.

Biography

Training
Atherton grew up in Preston, Lancashire, England and started her training at Cardinal Newman College before moving to Mountview Academy of Theatre Arts. She graduated in 1999. Whilst training at Mountview, she played Fern in Charlotte's Web at the Polka Children's Theatre in Wimbledon, London.

Theatre credits
After her training, she played Iris Bentley in Let Him Have Justice, which she co-wrote. She was later cast in the lead role of Sophie in the West End production of Mamma Mia! (2000), and then as Serena Katz in the national tour of Fame. A season was then spent appearing in Out of This World at the Chichester Festival Theatre and as the Kolokolo Bird in the Stiles and Drewe musical Just So (2004). She was part of the premier of a new musical Ordinary Days at the Finborough Theatre, and Once Upon A Time At The Adelphi at the Liverpool Playhouse from 28 June 2008 to 2 August 2008.

In June 2006, Atherton became part of the original London cast of Avenue Q when the show transferred from Broadway to the Noël Coward Theatre in the West End. She played Kate Monster/Lucy the Slut, and continued playing the role until 1 December 2007. She returned to the production, which had then moved to the Gielgud Theatre, in December 2008 and continued playing her roles until 3 October 2009.
Subsequently in 2009, she created the role of Charlotte in the new musical Through the Door by British composer/lyricist Laurence Mark Wythe and American bookwriter Judy Freed, at the Trafalgar Studios in a West End production. In 2010 she appeared in the musical Tomorrow Morning at the Landor Theatre in South London, the award winning musical by Laurence Mark Wythe.

During the months of February and March 2011, Atherton starred alongside her Avenue Q castmate, Daniel Boys, in Ordinary Days at the Trafalgar Studios. The show was followed by Atherton putting on an intimate sessions concert, joined by various guest singers.

Notes From New York
Atherton is a founding member of the company of Notes From New York, which is a series of shows bringing the works of US composers to the West End stage. She has performed in five of the six Notes From New York shows to date. She appeared in the one off special Christmas in New York, part of the Notes From New York series, which was held at the Lyric Theatre on 9 December 2007. As part of Notes From New York, a production of The Last Five Years was held on three consecutive Sundays from 12 October 2008 at the Theatre Royal Haymarket. It returned again in May 2009 at the Duchess Theatre where it played for one week. She also appeared in Jonathan Larson's tick, tick... BOOM! which played at the Duchess Theatre in 2009, having its West End premiere.

Michael Bruce - Unwritten Songs
Atherton features as a performer on this album with "Portrait of a Princess", which was launched in April on Speckulation's website. The song is also featured on Atherton's website. The song is also available on Michael Bruce - Unwritten Songs, which Atherton has performed live at the Apollo Theatre twice and live in the Delfont room, in London's West End.

Other Ventures
Since leaving Avenue Q, Atherton has starred in various productions such as Ordinary Days. She has performed at the Great British Musical show in the West End. Atherton has also performed in West End Live, a showcase which takes place the third weekend in June.

Then, in her largest solo performance, Atherton performed at the Apollo Theatre in London on 26 June. Atherton performed hits from her second CD as well as reuniting and performing with Kate Monster and Daniel Boys, and appearing with special guests Richard Fleeshman, Michael Bruce, Lance Horne, and Tom Parsons on guitar.

From 29 September 2011, Atherton played the role of Sister Mary Robert in the first UK tour of Sister Act the Musical. Sister Act toured throughout the UK and Ireland.

Atherton starred in the new musical, The Opinion Makers alongside Daniel Boys, a coproduction between The Mercury Theatre, Colchester and Derby Theatre.

Atherton was included on the album MS. A Song Cycle, a musical theatre album benefitting the MS Society UK. Her song 'How Can I Tell You' was written by American composer Erin Murray Quinlan, with lyrics co-written by Rory Sherman.

Atherton recently starred as Janet Majors in the world premiere stage production of Shock Treatment, the musical sequel to The Rocky Horror Picture Show, at the King's Head Theatre Pub in Islington, followed by the world premiere of Pure Imagination.

Atherton is in demand as a concert performer and recently appeared as a headline performer alongside Ruthie Henshall and Aled Jones in Adam Hepkin's The Magic of the Musicals and as part of the Giggin' for Good concert series at the Actor's Church, Covent Garden.

In 2019, Atherton directed Club Mex at Hope Mill Theatre, Manchester.

A Girl of Few Words

Atherton released her first solo album on 3 October 2006. The music was composed by Charles Miller with lyrics by Kevin Hammonds and Adam Bard.
Track Listing
 "A Girl of Few Words"
 "If You Were Mine"
 "Let Me Inside"
 "He Wasn't You"
 "Be Careful"
 "Not Afraid Anymore"
 "Somebody's Falling"
 "Someone Find Me" (featuring Paul Spicer)
 "Clockwork"
 "Heaven Knows"
 "Home"
 "You Know How to Love Me"

No Space for Air

In June 2010, Atherton released her second studio album, No Space for Air. Described as a unique and groundbreaking album for the Spring Awakening and Lady Gaga generation, No Space for Air features material from Alanis Morissette, Skunk Anansie and Stephen Sondheim.

Track Listing
 "Weak"
 "Blind"
 "Lost in Translations"
 "Crawling"
 "Never Saw Blue Like That"
 "Broken Wings"
 "Losing My Mind"
 "Leather"
 "Silent Whispers"
 "Anywhere But Here"
 "Encore"
 "Annie's Song" (Hidden Track)

There's a Fine Fine Line

In June 2010, Atherton released the song "There's a Fine, Fine Line" from Avenue Q as a single. The single was a thank-you to her fans from that show.

Track Listing
 "There's a Fine Fine Line"
 Digital Booklet

Rush of Life
In November 2014, Atherton released her most personal studio album to date, Rush of Life, featuring songs written for her by Dougal Irvine, Craig Adams, Lance Horne, George Maguire and Benedict.

Track Listing
 "Trail of Behaviour" (featuring John Dagleish)
 "I Can't Make You Love Me"
 "Planet Me"
 "My Own"
 "Rush of Life"
 "Somebody New"
 "Your Body" (featuring George Maguire)
 "Say Something"
 "Whoever You Are" <small>(Hidden Track) written by julie atherton

References

External links
 Julie Atherton's Homepage
 Julie's Debut Album at Makingrecords.co.uk
 Notes From New York
Credits on broadwayworld.com
 

Alumni of the Mountview Academy of Theatre Arts
British actresses
British musical theatre actresses
Living people
British stage actresses
1978 births